Interleukin 12 receptor, beta 2 subunit is a subunit of the interleukin 12 receptor. IL12RB2 is its human gene. IL12RB2 orthologs have been identified in all mammals for which complete genome data are available.

The protein encoded by this gene is a type I transmembrane protein identified as a subunit of the interleukin 12 receptor complex. The co-expression of this and IL12Rβ1 proteins was shown to lead to the formation of high-affinity IL12 binding sites and reconstitution of IL12 dependent signaling. While the IL12Rβ1 subunit is constitutively expressed, the expression of the IL12RB2 gene is up-regulated by interferon gamma. In Th1 cells, IL-12 signaling through the IL12 receptor leads to the phosphorylation of STAT4 and continued Th1 differentiation. The IL12Rβ2 subunit plays an important role in Th1 cell differentiation, since its absence leads to an abortive Th1 differentiation that has dysfunctional production of Th1 effector molecules. The up-regulation of this gene is found to be associated with a number of infectious diseases, such as Crohn's disease and leprosy, which is thought to contribute to the inflammatory response and host defense.

Interactions
Interleukin 12 receptor, beta 2 subunit has been shown to interact with Janus kinase 2.

RNA editing
The mRNA of this protein is subject to RNA editing.

References

Further reading